Nicolas Szerszeń (born 31 December 1996) is a French–Polish professional volleyball player. He competed for France at the 2013 U19 World Championship held in Mexico. At the professional club level, he plays for LUK Lublin.  

In January 2020, Szerszeń changed his sport nationality to Polish.

Personal life
His father – Jacek Szerszeń, was also a volleyball player, playing in the top Polish volleyball league as a member of Resovia and Hutnik Kraków, two–time Polish Champion (1988, 1989) with the latter club.

Honours

College
 National championships
 2016  NCAA national championship, with Ohio State Buckeyes
 2017  NCAA national championship, with Ohio State Buckeyes

Individual awards
 2016: NCAA national championship – All Tournament Team
 2017: NCAA national championship – All Tournament Team (Most Outstanding Player)
 2018: NCAA national championship – All Tournament Team
 2020: Polish Championship – Best Server

References

External links

 
 Player profile at PlusLiga.pl 
 Player profile at Volleybox.net
 Ohio State Buckeyes 2017–18 Roster – Nicolas Szerszen

1996 births
Living people
Volleyball players from Paris
French men's volleyball players
Polish men's volleyball players
Ohio State Buckeyes men's volleyball players
Resovia (volleyball) players
Ślepsk Suwałki players
LKPS Lublin players
Outside hitters